Robert White (May 28, 1876 – August 15, 1935) was an American lawyer and Democratic politician in the U.S. state of West Virginia. White served four consecutive terms as the Prosecuting Attorney for Hampshire County (1912–1928), and served one term in the West Virginia Senate (1930–1934) representing the state's Fifteenth Senatorial District in the 40th and 41st Sessions of the West Virginia Legislature. During the 1933 legislative year, White served as the floor leader for the Democratic Party members of the West Virginia Senate.

White was born in Romney, West Virginia in 1876 to Hampshire County Clerk of Court Christian Streit White (1839–1917) and his second wife Catharine Steele White (1837–1869) and was the grandson of Hampshire County Clerk of Court John Baker White (1794–1862). White was educated at Potomac Academy and began his career in public service at the age of 16 as Deputy Clerk of Court in his father's law office. He studied jurisprudence at the West Virginia University College of Law graduating in 1899.

He began practicing law in Romney and was elected Prosecuting Attorney of Hampshire County in 1912. White was elected to the position four times, and served terms from 1912 to 1928. In addition, he served as the Commissioner of School Lands and as one of the Chancery Commissioners for Hampshire County. White was elected to represent the Fifteenth Senatorial District in the West Virginia Senate in 1930 and served in the senate until 1934. In 1933, White was chairman of the senate's Judiciary Committee and he was also appointed to two special committees: one on economy and efficiency to study state and municipal government spending, and another to investigate the road commission's awarding of a contract for gasoline, oil, and grease to the Standard Oil Company of New Jersey over the Elk Refining Company.

Following a prolonged illness, White died in Romney in 1935 at the age of 59.

Early life and education
Robert White was born on May 28, 1876, in Romney, West Virginia. He was the second child of Hampshire County Clerk of Court Christian Streit White (1839–1917) and his second wife Catharine Steele White (1837–1869), and the third eldest of his father's five children. White was a grandson of Hampshire County Clerk of Court John Baker White (1794–1862) and a great-grandson of the prominent Virginia judge Robert White (1759–1831). His uncle Robert White (1833-1915) served as Attorney General of West Virginia and his brother John Baker White (1868–1944) was a military officer and later served as a Charleston city councilman and president of the West Virginia Board of Control.

White received his early education in the public schools of Romney, and attended Romney's Potomac Academy. At the age of 16, he began his career in public service serving as the Deputy Clerk of Court in the office of his father, Christian Streit White, who was then serving as Clerk of Court for Hampshire County. In 1894, White graduated from Potomac Academy at the age of 18. Two years later, he began studying jurisprudence at the West Virginia University College of Law in Morgantown. He graduated from the West Virginia University College of Law in 1899, earning a Bachelor of Laws degree. White cast his first vote for Democratic Party presidential nominee William Jennings Bryan in the United States presidential election of 1900.

Law career 

Following his graduation in 1899 from West Virginia University, White returned to Romney and established a law practice. In 1903, he became associated with his father Christian Streit White in a law practice, following the conclusion of his father's term as Hampshire County Clerk of Court. White continued to practice law with his father until 1912, when he was elected to his first term as prosecuting attorney for Hampshire County.

Political career 
Before the age of 21, White represented Hampshire County as a delegate to a West Virginia Democratic Party state convention.

In 1912, he was first elected to serve as the prosecuting attorney for Hampshire County and was re-elected to the position four times, serving four, four-year terms from 1912 to 1928. While serving in this position, White was a strong proponent of the Good Roads Movement and under his leadership, the first concrete bridge was constructed in Hampshire County by the County Court.

Between 1917 and 1922, in addition to serving as the county's prosecuting attorney, White served as the commissioner of school lands and as one of the chancery commissioners for Hampshire County, along with Joshua Soule Zimmerman and James Sloan Kuykendall.

West Virginia Senate 
In 1930, White was elected to serve in the West Virginia Senate representing the state's Fifteenth Senatorial District. He served in the 40th and 41st Sessions of the West Virginia Legislature and completed his term in 1934. During the 1932 legislative year, the West Virginia Senate was led by the Republican Party majority. The following legislative year in 1933, White served as the floor leader for the West Virginia Senate's Democratic Party members. The West Virginia Senate's majority had shifted to the Democrats in 1933, and in January 1933, White was selected by A. G. Mathews, President of the West Virginia Senate, as chairman of the senate's Judiciary Committee. In this position, White introduced twelve bills in 1933 to correct errors and omissions in existing statutes. Also in the 1933 legislative year, White served as a member on the Finance; Roads and Navigation; Counties, Municipal Corporations; Rules; Medicine and Sanitation; Education; Privileges and Elections; and Redistricting committees. In the same year White was also appointed as a member on two special senate committees.

On January 19, 1933, White sponsored a resolution for the creation of a special committee on economy and efficiency to study state and municipal government spending. The committee was charged with making investigations, developing recommendations, and drafting bills to empower its recommendations. It was further permitted to summon witnesses, examine records, and to investigate all state and local government organizations to recommend further mechanisms to affect efficiency and economy. White was appointed to the committee, which consisted of the speaker of the House of Delegates, the president of the West Virginia Senate, and two members from each house.

In February 1933, White was one of four senate Democrats appointed to serve on a special committee to investigate the road commission's awarding of a contract for gasoline, oil, and grease to the Standard Oil Company of New Jersey over the Elk Refining Company of Charleston. The committee's creation and investigation was in response to the Elk Refining Company's protest of the commission's decision, and the company's advertisement in which it claimed that its contract bid was $10,387.50 lower than that of Standard Oil. The committee not only investigated the commission's decision, but also examined the Elk Refining Company's advertisement. White questioned the advertisement's merit and commented that the committee was "entitled to know what the motive behind this advertisement was." "If there isn't anything to investigate we shouldn't be here investigating," he concluded.

On February 28, 1933, White was a member of a subcommittee which drafted a bill calling for a special state referendum on the repeal of the Eighteenth Amendment to the United States Constitution. Under the plan, which was submitted by White, West Virginia would register its official stand on the proposed Twenty-first Amendment to end Prohibition in the United States at the federal level. The referendum was to choose a slate of 20 "wet" and 20 "dry" candidates for delegates to a state convention, which would present its final vote on the national repeal of Prohibition.

Personal life

Marriage and issue
White married Mabel Glasscock Fitch, the only child and daughter of E. H. Fitch and his wife Laura Glasscock Fitch, on January 7, 1903, in Washington, D.C. Fitch was a native of Vanceburg, Kentucky and she attended Marshall College while her family resided in Huntington. She completed her education in Washington, D.C. White and his wife Mabel had five children:
 John Baker White (born February 11, 1904)
 Mabel Glasgow White Cornwell (born February 18, 1906), married James Leighton Cornwell on August 25, 1926, in Hampshire County
 Elizabeth Steele White (born April 23, 1908)
 Roberta Huston White McFarland (born June 18, 1912), married Dr. William Franklin McFarland on June 13, 1936, in New Cumberland
 Robert White, Jr.

White's wife Mabel was an active member of the Presbyterian Church. While a passenger on a Baltimore and Ohio Railroad South Branch line train, Mabel took ill and died at the Wappocomo home of Garrett Williams Parsons on July 5, 1915. She was interred at Indian Mound Cemetery in Romney.

Later life and death 
White never remarried following his wife's death in 1915. In addition to White's church activities, he served as a master of the Masonic Lodge, and was affiliated with the Odd Fellows. Beginning in 1934, White endured 18 months of illness, and on August 14, 1935, his physician Dr. R. W. Dailey reported to the Cumberland Evening Times that he was in critical condition and was unlikely to recover. White succumbed to his illness and died at his residence in Romney on August 15, 1935, at the age of 59 as a result of arteriosclerosis. Myocarditis also contributed to his prolonged illness but was not the cause of his death. White was interred with Masonic rites on Saturday afternoon, August 17, 1935, at Indian Mound Cemetery in Romney. A number of state officials attended his funeral.

References

Bibliography

External links
 

1876 births
1935 deaths
19th-century American lawyers
20th-century American lawyers
20th-century American politicians
American people of English descent
American people of Scottish descent
American people of Swiss descent
Burials at Indian Mound Cemetery
County prosecuting attorneys in West Virginia
People from Romney, West Virginia
Presbyterians from West Virginia
Robert White family of Virginia and West Virginia
West Virginia lawyers
Democratic Party West Virginia state senators
West Virginia University College of Law alumni